56 Cygni is a single star in the northern constellation of Cygnus, located 135 light years from Earth. It is visible to the naked eye as a white-hued star with an apparent visual magnitude of 5.06. The star is moving closer to the Earth with a heliocentric radial velocity of −21.5. It has a relatively high proper motion, traversing the celestial sphere at an angular rate of /yr. According to Eggen (1998), this is a member of the Hyades Supercluster.

This is an A-type main-sequence star with a stellar classification of A6 V. Cowley et al. (1969) classified it as a Delta Delphini star, which is a type of suspected Am star. The star is around 394 million years old with a projected rotational velocity of 73 km/s. It has 1.72 times the mass of the Sun and is radiating 13 times the Sun's luminosity from its photosphere at an effective temperature of 8,124 K.

56 Cygni has a visual companion: a magnitude 11.9 star at an angular separation of  along a position angle of 48°, as of 2015.

References

A-type main-sequence stars
Am stars
Hyades Stream
Cygnus (constellation)
Durchmusterung objects
Cygni, 56
198639
102843
7984